Diving was contested at the 1990 Asian Games in Beijing, China from October 1 to October 6, 1990.

Medalists

Men

Women

Medal table

References 

 New Straits Times, October 1–7, 1990

External links
Medals

 
1990 Asian Games events
1990
Asian Games
1990 Asian Games